Ciurea is a commune in Iași County, Western Moldavia, Romania, part of the Iași metropolitan area. Situated 7 km south from the county seat of Iași, it is composed of seven villages: Ciurea, Curături, Dumbrava, Hlincea, Lunca Cetățuii, Picioru Lupului and Slobozia. It also includes the majority-Romani neighborhood of Zanea.

Notable people
Pavel Coruț, a writer, studied gymnasium in Ciurea.

Notable events
The Ciurea rail disaster happened here on 13 January 1917.

References

Communes in Iași County
Localities in Western Moldavia